Mikhail Alexandrovich Batorsky (25 January 1890  8 February 1938) was a Red Army Komkor.

The son of an officer and a member of the nobility, Batorsky fought in World War I as a staff officer, ending the war with the rank of lieutenant colonel. He sided with the Bolsheviks in the Russian Civil War, serving as a staff officer. During the Polish–Soviet War Batorsky served as chief of staff for the 16th Army and was decorated for his leadership. After the end of the war he became a cavalry commander and was head of a cavalry school. Batorsky was executed during the Great Purge and posthumously acquitted after Stalin's death.

Early life and World War I 
Batorsky was born on 25 January 1890 in Saint Petersburg, the son of an officer and a member of the nobility. In 1909, he graduated from the Page Corps with honors and became a cornet on 6 August, serving in Her Majesty's Lifeguard Cuirassier Regiment. On 6 August 1913 he was promoted to lieutenant. In 1914, Batorsky graduated from the General Staff Academy in the second class, with a transfer for an additional course.

After the announcement of mobilization for World War I in August 1914, he was seconded to his unit. He fought in World War I on the Northern Front and the Western Front. On 6 October Batorsky was awarded the Order of Saint Anna 4th class. He received the Order of Saint Vladimir 4th class with Swords and Ribbon on 15 March 1915. Between 20 April 1915 and 19 March 1916, he served as the senior adjutant of headquarters of the 23rd Army Corps. From 19 March to 17 April, Batorsky was the assistant senior adjutant of the General Department of the 5th Army's Quartermaster General staff. On 17 April, he became senior adjutant of the headquarters of the Guards Cavalry Corps, a position he held until March 1917. On 14 July 1916, he was promoted to staff captain, and was later promoted to captain with seniority for 19 July 1914. On 6 December 1916, Batorsky was awarded the Order of Saint Stanislaus, 3rd class, with Swords.

The February Revolution in March 1917 overthrew the Tsar and established the Russian Provisional Government, in whose army Batorsky continued to serve. Between 12 March and 26 August, he was a staff officer for assignments at the headquarters of the same corps.  Between August and November, Batorsky was senior adjutant of the operations department of the Special Army's Quartermaster General. In November, the October Revolution overthrew the Provisional Government and replaced it with Soviet Russia, after which the disintegration of the Imperial Army began to accelerate. Between November 1917 and January 1918, he was senior adjutant of the operations office department in the same army's Quartermaster General. On 25 January 1918, Batorsky transferred to become assistant chief of the Main Staff of the General Staff, with the rank of lieutenant colonel.

Russian Civil War 
In April 1918, Batorsky joined the Red Army.
He served mostly in staff functions. Between 7 June 1921 and 23 November 1921, he was Chief of Staff of the Western Front.

After the War he became commander of the 4th Cavalry Corps (January 1928 – October 1929).
He was arrested on July 17, 1937, sentenced on February 7, 1938 on charges of espionage and shot the next day. He was buried in the Kommunarka shooting ground.

References

Citations

Bibliography 
 
1890 births
1938 deaths
Soviet komkors

Recipients of the Order of the Red Banner
Russian military personnel of World War I
Soviet military personnel of the Russian Civil War
Great Purge victims from Russia
Military personnel from Saint Petersburg
Russian Provisional Government military personnel
Imperial Russian Army personnel
Soviet rehabilitations
Recipients of the Order of St. Anna, 4th class
Recipients of the Order of St. Vladimir, 4th class
Recipients of the Order of Saint Stanislaus (Russian), 3rd class